The Resort is an American dark comedy mystery television series created for Peacock by Andy Siara. The series stars William Jackson Harper and Cristin Milioti as a married couple on vacation at a holiday resort for their 10th anniversary, where they are drawn into a mystery that took place fifteen years before. It premiered on Peacock on July 28, 2022.

Premise 
Noah and Emma are vacationing in the Mayan Riviera for their 10th anniversary.  Noah has been content with life, whereas Emma feels like their marriage isn't advancing.  They are then pulled into an unsolved mystery of two missing persons from fifteen years ago, which tests the resolve of their marriage.

Cast

Main 
 Cristin Milioti as Emma
 William Jackson Harper as Noah
 Luis Gerardo Méndez as Baltasar Frías, head of security at the resort circa 2007
 Skyler Gisondo as Sam Lawford, a tourist who disappeared in 2007
 Nina Bloomgarden as Violet Thompson, a tourist who disappeared  in 2007
 Gabriela Cartol as Luna, a resort concierge
 Nick Offerman as Murray Thompson, the father of Violet, vacationing with her in 2007

Recurring 
 Dylan Baker as Carl Lawford, Sam's dad
 Becky Ann Baker as Jan Lawford, Sam's mom
 Debby Ryan as Hanna, Sam's girlfriend
 Ben Sinclair as Alexander Vasilakis, Oceana Vista owner
 Ricardo Laboy as Oliver, Oceana Vista bartender
 Carlos Rivera Marchand as Edwin, Oceana Vista concierge
 Gisela Rosario Ramos as Abigail, Oceana Vista landscaper

Guest 
 Michael Hitchcock as Ted, vacationing with his husband, also called Ted, who befriends Emma and Noah.
 Parvesh Cheena as Ted, vacationing with his husband, also called Ted, who befriends Emma and Noah.
 Sergio Calderón as Silverio Narro, a detective who was forced into retirement  after looking into the disappearance of Sam and Violet.
 Luis Guzmán as Illan Iberra, author of the novel La Desilusión del Tiempo

Episodes

Production

Development
In February 2020, it was reported that UCP was developing the dark comedy series The Resort from Sam Esmail and Andy Siara. In June 2021, it was announced Peacock had ordered the series, with Siara serving as a writer and Esmail serving as an executive producer under his Esmail Corp banner.

Casting
In January 2022, Luis Gerardo Méndez, Nina Bloomgarden, and Gabriela Cartol joined the cast in series regular roles, with Debby Ryan, Dylan Baker and Michael Hitchcock set to recur. In March 2022, William Jackson Harper, Cristin Milioti, Skyler Gisondo, and Nick Offerman joined the cast in series regular roles, while Ben Sinclair and Parvesh Cheena joined the cast in recurring capacity.

Filming
Principal photography was began in March 2022, in Puerto Rico, and wrapped by May 2022. Executive producer Ben Sinclair directed the first four episodes. The fifth and sixth episodes were directed by filmmaking duo Rania Attieh and Daniel Garcia, with Ariel Kleiman directing the final two episodes.

Release 
The eight-episode series premiered on July 28, 2022, exclusively on Peacock. The premiere consists of the first three episodes, with new episodes debuting each Thursday after that. On August 24, 2022, NBC aired the pilot episode at 9 p.m. after a semi-final episode of America's Got Talent.

Reception 
 Metacritic, which uses a weighted average, rated the series with a score of 70 out of 100, based on 16 critic reviews, indicating "generally favorable reviews".

References

External links 
 
 

2020s American black comedy television series
2020s American comedy-drama television series
2020s American mystery television series
2022 American television series debuts
English-language television shows
Magic realism television series
Peacock (streaming service) original programming
Television series about marriage
Television series about missing people
Television series about vacationing
Television series by Universal Content Productions
Television series by Anonymous Content
Television series set in 2007
Television series set in 2022
Television series set in hotels
Television shows filmed in Puerto Rico
Television shows set in Mexico